Ebrahimabad (also Romanized as Ebrāhīmābād) is a village in Sar Daq Rural District, Yunesi District, Bajestan County, Razavi Khorasan Province, Iran. At the 2006 census, its population was 92, in 22 families.

References 

Populated places in Bajestan County